Jack Bannon (born 24 March 1991) is an English actor, known for his role as Christopher Morcom in The Imitation Game, as Sam Thursday on the ITV drama series Endeavour (2013-2018,2023) and as Alfred Pennyworth on the Epix crime drama series Pennyworth (2019–2022).

Early life
Bannon was born and raised in Norwich. He completed high school at Notre Dame High School, Norwich before attending arts courses for a number of years at the Theatre Royal, Norwich. Despite being turned down for drama school on two occasions he landed his role on Endeavour in 2013.

Filmography

Film

Television

Theatre

References

External links
 
 

21st-century English male actors
English male film actors
English male stage actors
English male television actors
Living people
Actors from Norwich
1991 births